Trilofo ( meaning "three hills") is a village and a community in the municipality of Megalopoli, Arcadia, Greece. It is situated in the southwestern foothills of the Mainalo mountains, at about 550 m elevation. It is 2 km northeast of Nea Ekklisoula, 3 km southeast of Zoni, 3 km southwest of Karatoulas and 6 km north of Megalopoli. In 2011 Trilofo had a population of 35 for the village and 53 for the community, which includes the village Palaiomoiri.

Population

See also
List of settlements in Arcadia

References

External links
History and information about Trilofo
 Trilofo on GTP Travel Pages
 Palaiomoiri on Greek Wikipedia

Megalopolis, Greece
Populated places in Arcadia, Peloponnese